Desperados is a tequila-flavored pale lager beer with 5.9% alcohol by volume originally created and produced by the French brewing company Fischer Brewery, now produced by Zlatý Bažant Brewery.

Desperados has a 5.9% ABV. The beer is now sold in over fifty countries. 

Desperados' listed ingredients are water, malted barley, glucose syrup, corn, sugar, aromatic compounds (75% Tequila), citric acid, and hop extract.

References

External links

 

Heineken brands